Yahya Mosbah El Hindi (born 24 September 1998) is a footballer who plays as a defensive midfielder for  club Ansar.

El Hindi began his senior career at Sydney Olympic in 2017, before moving to Parramatta mid-2018 season. In 2019 he moved to the Middle East, playing for Nejmeh and Safa, in Lebanon, before joining Budaiya in Bahrain in 2020. El Hindi returned to Lebanon in 2021, signing for Ansar.

Born in Australia, El Hindi is of Lebanese descent and has represented Lebanon in the 2019 WAFF Championship.

Early life 
Australian at birth, El Hindi also holds Lebanese citizenship due to his origins. He was born in Sydney, and raised in the suburb of Bankstown.

Club career

Australia 
El Hindi began his youth career at Fraser Park in 2014, before signing for Rydalmere Lions the following year. After playing for Rockdale City Suns' youth team in 2016, El Hindi moved to Sydney Olympic in 2017. Mid-season in 2018 he moved to Parramatta, where he played 10 games in the 2018 NPL NSW 2.

Lebanon 
On 4 January 2019, El Hindi signed for Lebanese Premier League club Nejmeh. His debut for the club came on 26 January 2019, as a starter in a 2–0 league win over Racing Beirut. He played six league games during the 2018–19 season, as well as four games at the 2019 AFC Cup.

Safa signed El Hindi during the 2019 summer transfer window. Due to political unrest in the country, the 2019–20 season was cancelled; El Hidni was forced to return to Australia.

Budaiya 
On 28 November 2020, El Hindi moved to newly-promoted Bahraini Premier League side Budaiya. He played 16 league games in 2020–21, and helped his side avoid relegation by finishing in seventh place.

Ansar 
On 16 December 2021, El Hindi signed for Ansar in the Lebanese Premier League. He renewed with Ansar for an additional season on 29 June 2022.

International career 
El Hindi represented the Lebanon national under-23 team during the 2020 AFC U-23 Championship qualification, playing once against the United Arab Emirates in a 6–1 defeat.

His debut for the senior team came on 30 July 2019, in a 1–0 defeat against Iraq at the 2019 WAFF Championship. El Hindi became the third Australian to play for Lebanon, after Michael Reda and Buddy Farah. Despite the defeat, he was nominated Man of the Match.

Honours 
Ansar
 Lebanese FA Cup runner-up: 2021–22

See also
 List of Lebanon international footballers born outside Lebanon

References

External links

 
 
 
 
 Yahya El Hindi at SportsTG (2017–2018)
 Yahya El Hindi at SportsTG (2015)

1998 births
Living people
Australian people of Lebanese descent
Soccer players from Sydney
Lebanese Muslims
Australian Muslims
Lebanese footballers
Australian soccer players
Association football midfielders
Fraser Park FC players
Rydalmere Lions FC players
Rockdale Ilinden FC players
Sydney Olympic FC players
Parramatta FC players
Nejmeh SC players
Safa SC players
Budaiya Club players
Al Ansar FC players
National Premier Leagues
Lebanese Premier League players
Bahraini Premier League players
Lebanon youth international footballers
Lebanon international footballers
Lebanese expatriate footballers
Lebanese expatriate sportspeople in Bahrain
Australian expatriate soccer players
Australian expatriate sportspeople in Bahrain
Expatriate footballers in Bahrain